Dilbār; also Bandar-e Delvār (بندر دلوار); also known as Del Vāz, Dilba, and Dirbāk) is a city in Delvar District of Tangestan County, Bushehr province, Iran. At the 2006 census, its population was 3,201 in 723 households. The following census in 2011 counted 3,704 people in 922 households. The latest census in 2016 showed a population of 4,442 people in 1,238 households. Delvar is located near the coast, and a stadium is located to the southeast of the city.

References 

Cities in Bushehr Province
Populated places in Tangestan County